Trabzon Airport  is an airport near the city of Trabzon in the eastern Black Sea region of Turkey. The airport opened in 1957. In 2009, it served 1,596,905 passengers, of which most (95%) were on domestic routes. In 2009, Trabzon Airport ranked 9th for total passenger traffic, and 7th for domestic traffic among airports in Turkey.

Airlines and destinations
The following airlines operate regular scheduled and charter flights at Trabzon Airport:

Traffic statistics

Accidents and incidents 

On 13 January 2018, a Boeing 737-800 (TC-CPF) on Pegasus Airlines Flight 8622 veered off the left-hand side of the far end of runway 11 whilst landing. None of the 168 persons on board (162 passengers and 6 crew) were reported to have serious injuries.
The cause of the incident has not yet been determined.

On May 26, 2003 a Yakovlev
Yak-42 operated as Ukrainian-Mediterranean Airlines Flight 4230
Chartered by the Spanish Government, the aircraft was completing a charter flight from Bishkek to Zaragoza with an intermediate stop in Trabzon, carrying 62 Spanish peacekeepers and 13 crew members. The 62 passengers were respectively 41 members of the Land Forces and 21 members of the Air Force who were returning to Spain following a peacekeeping mission in Afghanistan. While descending to Trabzon Airport by night, the crew encountered poor visibility due to foggy conditions. Unable to establish a visual contact with the approach lights and the runway 29, the crew initiated a go-around procedure. Few minutes later, while completing a second approach, the crew failed to realize he was not following the correct pattern for an approach to runway 29 when the aircraft impacted a mountain at an altitude of 4,600 feet. The aircraft disintegrated on impact and all 75 occupants were killed. The wreckage was found 3,5 km east of the village of Maçka, about 23 km southwest of the airport.

On 20 May 1989, Alexander Zuyev, a Soviet pilot of the VVS Frontal Aviation Regiment based at Mikha Tskhakaya, Georgian SSR (present day Senaki, Georgia), defected from the Soviet Union by flying his Mig 29 plane to Trabzon. Turkey returned the plane to the Soviet Union, citing its desire to maintain a good relationship with the Soviet Union. However, the pilot was not extradited and was eventually provided asylum by the United States of America.

References

External links

Airports in Turkey
Buildings and structures in Trabzon Province
Transport in Trabzon Province